The MacFarlane Homestead Historic District is a U.S. historic district (designated as such on May 26, 1994) located in Coral Gables, Florida. The district is bounded by Jefferson Street, Frow Avenue, Brooker Street and Grand Avenue. It contains 32 historic buildings.

The district is named after Flora McFarlane (the "Mac" in the official district name is apparently an error), the area's first solo female homesteader and its first schoolteacher. McFarlane, born in New Jersey to British parents, settled 160 acres in the area beginning on March 16, 1891. Her home site, located where present-day Douglas Road and Day Avenue meet, no longer exists.

In 1925, Flora McFarlane sold the 20 acres that today constitute the historic district to Coral Gables founder George Merrick's company, which turned it into a city subdivision. Many Bahamian immigrant laborers, particularly Afro-Bahamians, subsequently built homes there.

References

2. "The Coconut Grove School," Gertrude M. Kent, Tequesta #XXXI (1971)

External links

 Miami-Dade County listings at National Register of Historic Places

African-American history of Florida
Afro-Caribbean culture in the United States
Bahamian-American culture in Florida
Historic districts on the National Register of Historic Places in Florida
National Register of Historic Places in Miami-Dade County, Florida
1994 establishments in Florida